Vanash-e Pain (also Romanized as Vanāsh-e Pā’īn; also known as Vanāsh) is a village in Alamut-e Pain Rural District, Rudbar-e Alamut District, Qazvin County, Qazvin Province, Iran. At the 2006 census, its population was 21, in 7 families.

References 

Populated places in Qazvin County